Kenjirō, Kenjiro, Kenjirou or Kenjiroh (written: 健二郎, 健次郎, 健治郎, 健滋朗, 謙二郎, 謙次郎, 建次郎, 賢二郎 or 乾二郎) is a masculine Japanese given name. Notable people with the name include:

, Japanese shogi player
, Japanese politician
, Japanese footballer
, Japanese writer
, Japanese manga artist
, Japanese sport wrestler
, Japanese actor
, Japanese basketball coach
, Japanese baseball player and manager
, Japanese swimmer
, Japanese baseball player
, Japanese artist
, Japanese rally driver
, Japanese mathematician
, Japanese engineer and television pioneer
, Japanese baseball player
, Japanese yacht racer
, Japanese writer and philosopher
, Japanese voice actor and actor
, Japanese educator and lawyer
, Japanese samurai, physicist and writer

Fictional characters 

 Kenjiro Shirabu (白布 賢二郎), a character from the manga and anime Haikyu!! with the position of setter from Shiratorizawa Academy

Japanese masculine given names